Terror of the Tug is a play written by Jean Battlo and based on events in the life of Police Chief Sid Hatfield just after the Matewan Massacre, a notable event in the history of West Virginia and its Pocahontas Coalfield, and the history of mining labor relations in the United States.

The events in the play Terror of the Tug took place after the historical events of the Coal Wars battle, depicted in the 1987 movie Matewan. 

The Tug of the title is the Tug Fork of the Big Sandy River that flows through the coal-mining region of West Virginia and Kentucky.

References

External links
 Jessica Lilly, "'Terror of the Tug' play celebrates 10 years", West Virginia Public Broadcasting, 30 Jul 2009
 McArts Players, "Terror of the Tug" webpage
 YouTube.com:  "Terror of the Tug 2011" video

American plays
Plays set in West Virginia
Plays based on actual events
Coal Wars
Labor disputes in the United States
Pocahontas Coalfield
Labor relations in West Virginia